VOWR is a radio station in St. John's, Newfoundland and Labrador, Canada. The station is operated by the Wesley United Church of Canada and operates a mix of 30% religious programming and 70% secular programming, including classical, folk, country, oldies, military/marching band, adult standards, beautiful music and music from the 1940s through the 1970s, interviews and informational programs. VOWR has several information based programs that are of interest to its core demographic including Consumer Reports, a gardening show, the 50+ Radio Show and many others of a wide range of subjects.

VOWR is a non-profit station staffed by volunteers, of which many are former broadcasters in the public and private local broadcasting industry.

VOWR transmits on 800 kHz. The dominant station on 800 kHz is XEROK in Ciudad Juárez, Mexico.

VOWR first signed on July 24, 1924 under the call sign 8WMC, which stood for the Wesley Methodist Church. Reverend Joseph G. Joyce (1889–1959) started the station to provide church services to shut-ins, but soon expanded it to provide public service announcements and entertainment.

VOWR is one of just four broadcast radio stations in Canada whose call letters do not begin with CB (for the CBC), CF, CH, CI, CJ, or CK. The others, VOCM, VOCM-FM and VOAR-FM, are also based in the St. John's area. With exception of VOCM-FM, which launched in 1982, all of these stations first aired before Newfoundland joined Canadian Confederation in 1949. The ITU prefix VO was originally assigned to Newfoundland and remains in use by radio amateurs.

References

External links
 VOWR
 
 

Radio stations in St. John's, Newfoundland and Labrador
Christian radio stations in Canada
Radio stations established in 1924